Acanthocobitis (Paracanthocobitis) rubidipinnis also known as the cherryfin zipper loach is a species of ray-finned fish in the genus, or subgenus, Paracanthocobitis. This species is known from the Irrawaddy basin in Myanmar.

References

rubidipinnis
Fish described in 1860
Taxa named by Edward Blyth